The Temple of the Earth (traditional Chinese: 地壇; simplified Chinese: 地坛; pinyin: Dìtán) in Beijing, China, is located in the northern part of central Beijing, around the Andingmen area and just outside Beijing's second ring road. It is also located just a few hundred yards north of Yonghe Temple. At 42.7 hectares, it is the second largest of the four Temples of Beijing behind only the Temple of Heaven.

It was built in 1530 during the Ming dynasty. Emperors of the Ming and Qing dynasties would attend the annual summer solstice ritual of offerings to the heaven.

Directly opposite it, at the other side of the city, is the Temple of Heaven in Chongwenmen, southern urban Beijing.

History

Location, Architecture and Construction 
The Temple of Earth (also referred to as the Ditan Park) was constructed in 1530 by the Jiajing Emperor during the Ming dynasty.  The park covers a 40 hectares space outside of Beijing's second ring road.  This places the park in the middle of a heavily populated area.  The park features lush gardens and tree lined paths.  During the Cultural Revolution, the temple was damaged; however, the site has been restored and renovated since then. 

For thousands of years, the Chinese have believed that important cosmic things could be symbolized using common shapes and directions.  Because the Temple symbolizes the Earth, its footprint is square in shape.  The square is a powerful symbol in Chinese culture and mythology which can mean Earth or the ground.  The Temple's construction mirrors these beliefs with its many square walls and altars.  The Temple of Earth is also located in the north of Beijing, north being the direction associated with the Earth. In contrast to this, the much larger Temple of Heaven is circular in shape, symbolizing the heavens and sky, and is located in the south of Beijing.  These two temples, along with the Temple of the Moon and Temple of the Sun (located in the west and east, respectively), interact with each other in spiritually important ways. The Chinese government has listed the Earth temple as one of the most important historical monuments under special preservation.

Ditan Park Today 

It is common to see foreigners and Chinese tourists in the actual Temple of Earth in the park.  The Temple itself is actually a very small (and underwhelming - when comparing with the Temple of Heaven) portion of the park.  Aside from the Temple, the park offers a children's play arcade, water calligraphy (where tourists can purchase oversized brushes and  "paint" with water on the cement.), food, and other attractions.  The park is frequented by joggers and runners, and is a very popular place to do Tai Chi.  Since the 1980s, traditional temple fairs have been held regularly during the Chinese lunar new year.

Religious Purpose 
The Temple of Earth is the main temple in Beijing where people can worship the god of Earth.

Rituals and Events 
The Temple of Earth was used for a specific purpose.  Emperors of the Ming, and then later the Qing dynasties used the Temple for sacrifices which were used to appease the gods, who in turn would help the nation.  These sacrifices took place at the Temple of Earth during the summer solstice.  Some things that sacrifices were done for include good harvest, a strong stable nation, and good weather.

During the Chinese New Year (which usually begins on the first day of the first lunar month of the year) the Temple of Earth holds a very popular festival.  The festival features thousands of red lanterns hanged on the many trees of the park, and thousands of locals and tourist flock to the park every year to participate.

Shrines, Altars and Buildings 
The altar in the centre of the Temple of Earth in Ditan Park is called Fang Ze Tan, or "square water altar".  The altar is square shaped, once again referring to the old Chinese idea of a square shaped Earth.  The altar used to be surrounded by water, but these days it is drained.  The altar was used to offer sacrifices to the Earth God.  On a north-south axis, the temple consists of 5 main buildings. The Fangze Altar, The Imperial Respecting House,  The Sacrifice Pavilion, The Fast Palace and the Divine Warehouse. The Fangze platform, also known as the Worship Platform, is the main building in the temple covering almost 18,000 square meters.

See also 
 Temple of Heaven
 Temple of the Sun
 Temple of the Moon

References 
 Luis E. Estrada. "Temple of Earth and Niujie Mosque."  Travel Blog. 27 January 2008. 
 Sinotour. "Sinotour.com Tour Guide to Beijing" Sinotour. 2008. 
 Sinotour. "Sinotour.com Tour Guide to Beijing" Sinotour. 2008. 
 Clarke. "Ditan Park." Beijing Guide 2008. 3 March 2008.  
 Clarke. "Temple of Heaven." Beijing Guide 2008. 3 March 2008.  
 Government of China. "Temple of Sun Park".  The Official Website of the 2008 Olympic Games.  2008.

External links
 

Buildings and structures completed in 1530
Dongcheng District, Beijing
Major National Historical and Cultural Sites in Beijing
Religious buildings and structures completed in 1530
Taoist temples in Beijing